The 1993 Australian Sports Sedan Championship was a CAMS sanctioned national motor racing title for drivers of Group 2D Sports Sedans.

Rounds
The championship was contested over an eight-round series:
 Round 1, Oran Park, New South Wales, 7 March
 Round 2, Oran Park, New South Wales, 7 March
 Round 3, Sandown Park, Victoria, 18 April
 Round 4, Sandown Park, Victoria, 18 April
 Round 5, Lakeside, Queensland, 5 September
 Round 6, Lakeside, Queensland, 5 September
 Round 7, Oran Park, New South Wales, 24 October
 Round 8, Oran Park, New South Wales, 24 October
Championship points were awarded on a 20-15-12-10-8-6-4-3-2-1 basis to the first ten finishers in each round.

Results

Note: There were only nine finishers in Rounds 3 & 8

References

Sports Sedan Championship
National Sports Sedan Series